Two Temple Place, known for many years as Astor House, is a Neo-Gothic building situated near Victoria Embankment in central London, England. It is known for its architecture, and contains notable works by the likes of William Silver Frith, Sir George Frampton RA, Nathaniel Hitch and Thomas Nicholls.

On 28 October 2011, Two Temple Place opened as a public gallery. It hosts exhibitions showcasing publicly owned art from regional collections in the United Kingdom, and is also used as a venue for private hire.

Overview
The building was constructed on Temple Place by John Loughborough Pearson for William Waldorf Astor, in 1895.  Originally known as the Astor Estate Office, it had a residential flat above the offices for Viscount Astor's use (Pevsner).  It consists of two floors and a lower ground floor and is designed after the Early Elizabethan style. It is built entirely of Portland stone. The exterior stonework features splendid carvings by Nathaniel Hitch.

Above the machicolated parapets is a weather vane, representing the caravel Santa Maria in which Columbus sailed to America. The intention was to symbolize the connection of the path of discovery of his ancestor John Jacob Astor and the linking of United States and Europe. It was executed by J. Starkie Gardner, the English metal worker, who was responsible for all metalwork inside and outside the building.

John Dibblee Crace, one of a family of interior decorators, decorated the interior of Two Temple Place for Astor in the style of French Renaissance from about 1892 to 1895. He also decorated Astor's home in Cliveden.  In what had been a bedroom, Astor had the walls paneled with "precious woods" and the ceiling gilded.

History

William Waldorf Astor
William Waldorf Astor, founder of the famed New York City Waldorf Astoria, owned the gothic mansion on the Victoria Embankment overlooking the River Thames. He built or renovated the home that was to become a "crenellated Tudor stronghold" with three things in mind. It would be his office and it had residential space, supporting his desire to create a home away from the United States where he felt his children would be safer from the threat of kidnapping. Second, he had the wealth to support his vision for an opulent home for himself and his family – and his extensive collections of art work, musical instruments and books. And, lastly, he wanted the building to be both his home and offices for managing his holdings.

The building is described by Donald Strachan as follows:
Behind the sturdy Portland stone facade, the interior has a slight strange Victoriana-meets-Disney vibe with the otherwise straightforwardly opulent rooms (lots of marble and mahogany) adorned with bizarre details, such as the characters from The Three Musketeers (Astor's favorite book) on the banisters of the main staircase and the gilded frieze in the Great Hall showing 54 seemingly random characters from history and fiction, including Pocahontas, Machiavelli, Bismark, Anne Boleyn, and Marie Antoinette.

The architect was John Loughborough Pearson, often called the founder of Modern Gothic architecture. With seemingly unlimited funds at his disposal Pearson was able to design a lavish building with the assistance of eminent craftsmen. John Thompson & Sons Ltd of Peterborough were the builders. After Pearson's death, his son Frank Loughborough Pearson (1864–1947) continued his work on Two Temple Place when the building required some alterations under the ownership of Sun Life of Canada. For these alterations many of the original craftsmen were used again, including Nathaniel Hitch, as well as the original builder.

Intermediate owners
Since the Astor family sold the house it has had various owners: Sun Life of Canada owned the building from 1919 to 1928, who named it Sun of Canada House. In 1928 it was purchased by the Society of Incorporated Accountants and Auditors naming it the Incorporated Accountants Hall. On 19 February 1929 the building was opened as the "Head Office of the Society" by H.R.H. the Duke and Duchess of York.  Smith & Nephew purchased the building in 1960 which served as its headquarters.

On 24 July 1944 the building, named "Astor House" at the time, was hit by a German flying bomb, which caused considerable damage to the house, including burst plumbing that resulted in some flooding, damaging expensive works of art, including works by William Silver Frith.  The building, called "Accountants Hall" on the damage report, was deemed as suitable to be "partially demolished" and was fully restored between 1949 and 1951.

The Bulldog Trust
It is now managed and preserved by The Bulldog Trust, a charitable organization, and is hired out for personal and functions. It opened to the public as a gallery in October 2011.

Two Temple Place gallery
Bulldog Trust, a charitable foundation, manages Two Temple Place, which is available to the public to view its collections and, for revenue generation, is hired out. On 28 October 2011, Two Temple Place opened as the first London venue to specifically showcase publicly owned art from UK regional collections.

The first exhibition to launch the building was in collaboration with the William Morris Gallery in Walthamstow. Titled William Morris: Story, Memory, Myth, the exhibition looked at how William Morris told stories through pattern and poetry and examined the tales that were most important to him, such as the works of Geoffrey Chaucer, Norse saga, Arthurian legend and Greek myth.

The forecourt and portico
One enters the building through some fine iron gates that lead onto a paved forecourt and lawn with an arcaded boundary wall on one side and on the other a portico designed by Frith. Balustraded stone steps lead up to the main door, these steps being flanked on either side by two magnificent bronze lamp standards featuring the figures of two small mischievous-looking boys.  These cherubs by Frith, with one conversing through a telephone, celebrate the then new age of telecommunication and electricity.

The other cherub on the left side of the stairs holds up a globe.

The vestibule

Through the entrance doors one enters a stone-lined vestibule with carvings in the early Renaissance style and inside this vestibule there is a War Memorial Stone remembering those members of The Society of Incorporated Accountants and Auditors who died in the 1914–18 war, this unveiled by the Duke of York and a Commemoration stone recording the Hall's opening by the Duke and Duchess of York on 19 February 1929.

The floor is the work of Robert Davison and is a mixture of marble, jasper, porphyry and onyx all laid in geometrical patterns. This is known as "opus alexandrinum". It was Davison who was responsible for all the marble work in the house. There is a similar floor in Westminster Abbey. The staircase is made of oak and mahogany.

The main staircase and gallery
The main staircase rises up from the Staircase Hall to the Gallery on the first floor and comprises three flights of stairs.  The staircase has seven mahogany carvings by Thomas Nicholls on the newel posts, these representing characters from Alexandre Dumas’s The Three Musketeers, which, it seems, was Astor’s favourite novel.

Nicholls’ characters include d'Artagnan himself, Madame Bonacieux, Aramis, shown slipping off a scholar’s gown and at the same time reading a love letter, Milady, Bazin, Athos and Porthos.  Bazin, the valet to Aramis, was a studious person who later became a lay brother. Nicholls carves him brushing his master's clothes while studying theology.

Thomas Nicholls’ frieze and carvings
"Rip Van Winkle" and characters from The Last of the Mohicans and The Scarlet Letter are depicted in a frieze in the main hall. This frieze was also executed by Thomas Nicholls. Two of the figures are from the Leatherstocking novels of James Fenimore Cooper, the first being The Last of the Mohicans the nickname of Uncas, a leading character in the book. The second statue is that of "The Pathfinder", one of the names given to Leatherstocking (otherwise Natty Bumppo). Next Nathaniel Hawthorne’s Scarlet Letter is represented by Hester Prynne and the Reverend Arthur Dimmesdale. The two remaining characters are Washington Irving’s Rip Van Winkle and his daughter. At the feet of Rip Van Winkle is his dog and at those of his daughter is the gnomes’ keg of liquor, the drinking of which had sent Van Winkle into his long slumber and freedom from his bothersome wife for 20 years!

The staircase hall is overlooked by a gallery that features statues made by Nicholls, having American literary associations, and a frieze in relief which features 82 characters from Shakespeare’s Othello, Henry VIII, Antony and Cleopatra and Macbeth. Around this gallery are ten pillars of solid ebony. The statues are positioned on six of the carved oak panels which surmount these pillars.  The ceiling of the staircase Hall and Gallery is in stained glass, coved and panelled.

The Great Hall

Study or library
Astor's study, located off the gallery and overlooking the Thames, held his vast collection of collectible books and art. It was also home to business meetings. The room was described by a London area architect thus:

There is no more curious room in London than this hall which was intended by its creator to be a sort of temple to culture and expresses in a curious way his own tastes in art and literature.

From the pencil cedar panel walls, 35-foot mahogany ceilings and doors, Astor adorned the room with Spanish mahogany panelling, carving, such as the Four Musketeers and decorations. Accoutrements of the room included marble floors, Persian rugs, chandeliers, and portraits of himself and his ancestors. Located by his desk in the library was a spinning wheel of New England.

Sir George Frampton’s panels
The entrance door to the Great Hall is made of mahogany, has a beautifully carved head and nine decorative panels in silver gilt by Sir George James Frampton. These panels, which were exhibited at the Royal Academy prior to installation in the house, depict in low relief the nine heroines of the Arthurian Legend, to Thomas Malory’s version, of which Tennyson gave a new interpretation. The first two panels depict the "Lady of the Isle of Avelyon" and "Elaine" ("The lily maid of Astolat"). The third, fourth and fifth panels depict "The Lady of the Lake", "Morgan le Fay" and "Guinevere" (for whom "A man had given all other bliss/And all his worldly worth for this/To waste his whole heart in one kiss/Upon her perfect lips"). The sixth, seventh and eighth panels depict "La Beale Isoude", "Lyonors" and "Enid". The ninth and final panel depicts "Alis la Beale Pilgrim".

Nathaniel Hitch’s frieze
The Great Hall extends the whole length of the building on the river front. The walls are panelled in pencil cedar and surmounted by a frieze in which  fifty-four portraits of the heads of characters famous in history and fiction, have been modelled, carved in low relief and then gilded.  These 54 portraits are by the sculptor Nathaniel Hitch. The Hall is 35 feet high to the ridge and open to a hammer-beam type roof, a notable example of modern Gothic timber work made from carved Spanish mahogany.

The frieze portraits include Juliet, Queen Louise of Prussia and Richard Coeur de Lion

Above the frieze and standing within tracery canopies under the roof principals are twelve carved figures from literature, including Ivanhoe, Robin Hood and Maid Marion. At either end of the Great Hall are carved pencil cedar chimney pieces and at one end there are some bench ends carved by Hitch these being fine examples of his work. Photographs of these carvings are included in the album of photographs of Hitch's work held at the Henry Moore Archive in Leeds.

Stained-glass windows
At the eastern and western ends of the Great Hall are stained-glass windows which are the work of Clayton and Bell.  One of these is called A Swiss Summer Landscape and includes Thun Castle in the Swiss Canton of Bern.  Clayton and Bell often collaborated with John Loughborough Pearson, their other work including the stained-glass windows at Truro Cathedral.

Gallery

Exterior

Interior

Notes

References

Further reading

External links

 
 Bulldog Trust, at Two Temple Place

Buildings and structures completed in 1895
Art museums established in 2011
2011 establishments in England
Houses in the City of Westminster
Gothic Revival architecture in London
Art museums and galleries in London
Tourist attractions in the City of Westminster
Grade II* listed buildings in the City of Westminster
Astor family residences